Cystothalamia is an extinct genus of sea sponges in the family Guadalupiidae that existed during the Permian and Triassic in what is now Austria, Hungary, Slovenia, Tajikistan, Croatia, Iran, Italy,  Russia, Thailand, Tunisia, the United States (New Mexico and Texas), and Venezuela. It was described by G.H. Girty in 1909, and the type species is Cystothalamia nodulifera.

Species
Cystothalamia conica
Cystothalamia crassa
Cystothalamia megacysta
Cystothalamia nana
Cystothalamia nodulifera
Cystothalamia ramosa
Cystothalamia vandegraafi
Cystothalamia surmaqensis

References

External links
 Cystothalamia at the Paleobiology Database.

Guadalupiidae
Fossil taxa described in 1908